Martin v. Boise (full case name Robert Martin, Lawrence Lee Smith, Robert Anderson, Janet F. Bell, Pamela S. Hawkes, and Basil E. Humphrey v. City of Boise) was a
2018 decision by the U.S. Court of Appeals for the Ninth Circuit in response to a 2009 lawsuit by six homeless plaintiffs against the city of Boise, Idaho regarding the city's anti-camping ordinance. The ruling held that cities cannot enforce anti-camping ordinances if they do not have enough homeless shelter beds available for their homeless population.  It did not necessarily mean a city cannot enforce any restrictions on camping on public property.

The decision was based on the Eighth Amendment to the U.S. Constitution's prohibition on cruel and unusual punishment. 

In 2019, the U.S. Supreme Court declined to hear an appeal of the case, leaving the precedent intact in the nine Western states under the jurisdiction of the Ninth Circuit (Alaska, Arizona, California, Hawaii, Idaho, Montana, Nevada, Oregon, and Washington).

History
In 2009, after a local homeless shelter in Boise closed, six individuals were cited for violations of a city ordinance that makes it illegal to sleep on public property.  One of those individuals, Robert Martin, along with the others, represented by Howard Belodoff, filed a lawsuit challenging the constituitionality of an ordinance that punishes someone for sleeping outside when they have nowhere else to go.

In 2021, the city settled the lawsuit by agreeing to spend $1.3 million for additional shelter spaces, $435,000 for the plaintiffs' attorneys fees, and agreed to amend ordinances on public sleeping as well as to train their police not to arrest individuals or issue citations when there is no shelter space available.  Persons who are offered appropriate available shelter space, but refuse to go could still be cited, under the settlement.

Current interpretation
The ruling leaves undecided the issue of whether it is legal to set limits on which public properties and during what hours camping or sleeping can be prohibited; the city of Sacramento, for example, allows sleeping on the City Hall grounds at night but not during the day, and this arrangement is not explicitly banned by the ruling.

References

United_States_Court_of_Appeals_for_the_Ninth_Circuit_cases
Homelessness in the United States